Yusufhona is a village in Bostanliq District, Tashkent Region, Uzbekistan.

References

Populated places in Tashkent Region